The Näcken-class submarines, also known as the A14 type, were built for the Swedish Navy in the late 1970s. The boats were authorised in 1972 and the programme was completed in 1980
. All boats were built by Kockums in Karlskrona. This technology increased underwater endurance to 14 days and has been adopted in subsequent Swedish submarines.

By the early 2000s the class was decommissioned from the Swedish navy as a result of defence cuts in the year 2000 Defence White Paper.  was temporary leased to the Royal Danish Navy but was returned in 2005.

Ships

References

Notes

Bibliography
 Conway's All the World's Fighting Ships 1947-1995

 
Submarine classes